George J. Kanuck (born April 26, 1943) is a former Republican member of the Pennsylvania House of Representatives.
 He was born in Marion, Indiana.

References

Republican Party members of the Pennsylvania House of Representatives
Living people
1943 births